Rolando Patricio Vera Rodas (born April 27, 1965 in Cuenca, Azuay) is a retired long-distance runner from Ecuador, who represented his native country at three consecutive Summer Olympics, starting in 1988. He reached the top ten of the 10,000 metres at the 1987 World Championships in Athletics. He enjoyed much championship success at the regional level: he was a two-time South American Champion on the track and won gold medals at the South American Games and Bolivarian Games, as well as reaching the podium at the Ibero-American Championships and the 1987 Pan American Games.

He won road running competitions on four continents and was tenth at the 1994 IAAF World Half Marathon Championships. Vera won the Saint Silvester Road Race four times consecutively in the 1980s. In 1995 he won both the Los Angeles Marathon and the Chuncheon Marathon, and he won the Beppu-Ōita Marathon two years later. At Olympic level he competed in the marathon on two occasions (1992 and 1996). He remains the Ecuadorian record holder over 20 km and the half marathon. His personal best in the marathon is 2:10:46 – a time which brought him third at the 1990 Boston Marathon.

Career

Early competition
He began his career on the track and was fourth over 5000 metres in 14:24.16 at the 1984 Pan American Junior Championships. He also took part in the 2000 m steeplechase, where he finished in sixth. Taking part in the regional competition at the 1986 South American Games, he beat the field (which included continental champion Emilio Ulloa) to win in 28:53.90. His first major senior medal came when he took the 10,000 metres bronze medal at the 1986 Ibero-American Championships. He also won the Saint Silvester Road Race that year – a competition he won four times consecutively up to 1989. Other road victories over this period included the Cherry Creek Sneak 5 Mile in 1986, the Cascade Run Off in 1987, and the Bolder Boulder race in 1989.

At the 1987 South American Championships in Athletics he won the 5000 m gold medal and a silver medal in the 10,000 m. Out on the road that year, he took victory at the seven-mile Falmouth Road Race. A second silver of the season at the 1987 Pan American Games (behind Bruce Bickford) preceded his global debut at the 1987 World Championships in Athletics, where he finished in tenth and was the only South American athlete in the race. His time of 28:20.24 was also a record for a South American under-23 athlete.

At the 1988 Bolder Boulder he won the 10k with a time of 29:07. Rosa Mota won the women's 10k that year.

Olympic debut
Vera made his Olympic debut at the 1988 Seoul Olympics and reached the final of the 10,000 m, finishing in 15th place. He topped the podium in the men's 10,000 m at the 1989 South American Championships in Athletics, winning his first continental title. He doubled up at the 1989 Bolivarian Games and won the 10,000 m as well as taking silver in the 5000 m behind José Castillo. Vera ran at the Boston Marathon in April 1990 and finished in third place with a personal best time of 2:10:46. A month later he competed in the inaugural Trib 10K race in San Diego and, although still tired from his efforts in Boston, he won the race in an Ecuadorian record time of 28:08 minutes. In 1991, he was the winner of the Philadelphia Distance Run.

His third appearance on the global stage came at the 1992 Summer Olympics and he moved off the track and up to the marathon distance. He finished in 43rd place, although this was the second best performance by a South American after Brazil's Osmiro Silva. He also won a bronze over 10,000 m at the 1992 Ibero-American Championships, repeating his performance of four years earlier. The following year Vera retained his 10,000 m title at the 1993 Bolivarian Games. In 1994, he won the Parelloop 10 km race in the Netherlands and went on to finish tenth at the 1994 IAAF World Half Marathon Championships in Oslo later that year – setting a national record mark of 1:01:36 for the half marathon distance. On the circuit that year he also won at the Marvejols-Mende in France.

Los Angeles winner
He began 1995 with a win at the San Blas Half Marathon in Puerto Rico, and continued his winning ways at the Los Angeles Marathon where he ran a very tactical race, which was held in poor weather conditions. Vera's outright refusal to take his turn at the front of the leading pack (and thus bear his share of the wind and rain) angered the reigning marathon world champion Mark Plaatjes. After 20 miles, Vera tucked in behind the only remaining leader Bob Kempainen and defied Kempainen's attempts to shake him off – following his zig-zag movements across the road. Finally taking the lead in the final stages, Vera enjoyed a tailwind and won the race in 2:11:39 (twenty seconds ahead of the other runners). Kempainen later commented: "I kept trying to get him out front to take the lead, but I couldn't very well turn around and ask him to do it...I guess he ran it smart".

He also went on to win at the Chuncheon Marathon that year. He enjoyed success over the 20 km distance, winning at the Ogden Newspapers 20K in 1995 and the following year. Vera's final Olympic appearance was at the 1996 Atlanta Games and he was ranked 22nd in the men's Olympic marathon race. He won the Beppu-Ōita Marathon in 1997 with a time of 2:12:00.

International competitions

References

External links
 

1965 births
Living people
People from Cuenca, Ecuador
Ecuadorian male long-distance runners
Ecuadorian male marathon runners
Ecuadorian male steeplechase runners
Olympic athletes of Ecuador
Athletes (track and field) at the 1988 Summer Olympics
Athletes (track and field) at the 1992 Summer Olympics
Athletes (track and field) at the 1996 Summer Olympics
Pan American Games silver medalists for Ecuador
Pan American Games medalists in athletics (track and field)
Athletes (track and field) at the 1987 Pan American Games
Athletes (track and field) at the 1995 Pan American Games
World Athletics Championships athletes for Ecuador
South American Games gold medalists for Ecuador
South American Games silver medalists for Ecuador
South American Games medalists in athletics
Competitors at the 1986 South American Games
Competitors at the 1986 Goodwill Games
Medalists at the 1987 Pan American Games